Coralito (Little coral), is a Puerto Rican telenovela produced by Telemundo. The main characters were played by Sully Díaz and Salvador Pineda. Díaz played the character of Coralito. The telenovela played in 1984. Ednita Nazario performed the theme song of the telenovela titled Mi Pequeño Amor, (My Small Love), written by her then husband, Argentine-Venezuelan composer, Laureano Brizuela, who also perform the song with her.

References 

1983 telenovelas
1983 Puerto Rican television series debuts
1984 Puerto Rican television series endings
1980s Puerto Rican television series
Puerto Rican telenovelas
Telemundo telenovelas
Television shows set in Puerto Rico